The Space Flight Operations Facility (SFOF) is a building containing a control room and related computing and communications equipment areas at the Jet Propulsion Laboratory in Pasadena, California. NASA's Deep Space Network is operated from this facility. The SFOF has monitored and controlled all interplanetary and deep space exploration for NASA and other international space agencies since 1963. The facility also acted as a backup communications facility for Apollo missions.

It was declared a National Historic Landmark in 1985 and is on the National Register of Historic Places.

Public tours are available with advance planning.

History
In the early years, the operations control center of the Deep Space Network did not have a permanent facility. It was a makeshift setup with numerous desks and phones installed in a large room near the computers used to calculate orbits. In July 1961, NASA started the construction of the permanent facility, Space Flight Operations Facility (SFOF). The facility was completed in October 1963 dedicated on May 14, 1964. In the initial setup of the SFOF, there were 31 consoles, 100 closed-circuit television cameras, and more than 200 television displays to support Ranger 6 to Ranger 9 and Mariner 4.

Current operations

As of 2012, there were 22 spacecraft monitored from this facility. Depending on the operations of the spacecraft, they are scheduled to be online for 1 to 10 hours at a time. Notable is that the facility also processes the signal from Voyager 1 that is sent from about 11 billion miles from Earth. With data feeding into the Space Flight Operations Facility from every NASA spacecraft beyond low earth orbit, including rovers, orbiters, and deep-space probes, there is a plaque in the middle of the room designating the facility "The Center of the Universe."

See also
A list of other Deep Space Network facilities:
 Goldstone Deep Space Communications Complex
 Madrid Deep Space Communication Complex
 Canberra Deep Space Communication Complex

References

External links
Official Site
Aviation: From Sand Dunes to Sonic Booms, a National Park Service Discover Our Shared Heritage Travel Itinerary
Man in Space, a NHL Theme study

Jet Propulsion Laboratory
National Historic Landmarks in California
Buildings and structures on the National Register of Historic Places in Pasadena, California
Government buildings on the National Register of Historic Places in California
Buildings and structures in Pasadena, California
Tourist attractions in Pasadena, California